Margalis is a surname. Notable people with the surname include:

Melanie Margalis (born 1991), American swimmer
Robert Margalis (born 1982), American swimmer

See also
Margalit